Tara Houska Zhaabowekwe (Couchiching First Nation) is a tribal attorney, land defender and climate justice activist.

Activism

Not Your Mascots 
She co-founded Not Your Mascots, an organization and social media campaign that educates the public about stereotyping and representation of Native Americans, including work on getting the Washington football team to change their name.

Pipeline protests 

Houska founded and runs the Giniw Collective. She and others from the collective fought for seven years against construction of the Line 3 pipeline, an oil pipeline running from Alberta, Canada to Wisconsin, USA. Three of those years she spent living in a tent on the pipeline's route, including during harsh winters. The tribal nations in the area maintain the treaty rights to hunt, fish, and gather on land along the pipeline, which crosses many bodies of water. The area is also where tribal nations grow wild rice, which has cultural and historic importance to the nations. The Giniw Collective often uses their bodies to stop or slow the construction process as a form of protest, including crawling inside the pipeline itself, squatting in trees, and tying themselves to machines. Houska has also engaged politicians directly, including meetings with the Biden administration to push for the federal government to intervene and suspend the permit for the project. Minnesota Now called her "one of the leaders in the movement to stop the construction of new pipelines."

Houska also fought against the Dakota Access Pipeline in 2016 and lived in the Standing Rock encampment for six months.

Other work 
She is also involved in other climate and social justice efforts, having written essays in All We Can Save, Vogue, the New York Times, and CNN. She is also a contributing writer for the Indian Country Media Network. She was the campaign director for Honor the Earth from 2016-2019.

Houska is a former adviser to Senator Bernie Sanders as his campaign Native American advisor. During his 2016 presidential campaign, she was the lead author for his Native policy platform.

Melinda Gates awarded Houska the Good Housekeeping 2017 Awesome Women award.

In 2021, Houska spoke at the 33rd European Green Party Council on climate change and biodiversity.

Personal life 
Houska was born in International Falls, Minnesota.

References

Living people
Year of birth missing (living people)
Native American activists
Land defender
Native American lawyers
Activists from Minnesota
21st-century Native American women
21st-century Native Americans